Acrobat is a flying roller coaster at Nagashima Spa Land, which opened on 18 July 2015.

The ride is a clone of Manta at SeaWorld Orlando.

References

Roller coasters in Japan
Flying roller coasters manufactured by Bolliger & Mabillard